Joe Bock may refer to:

Joe Bock (academic) (born 1957), University of Notre Dame official and former Missouri state representative
Joe Bock (American football) (born 1959), former American football player
Joseph Bock (1837–1925), American politician from Wisconsin